Two ships of the Royal Navy have borne the name HMS Mary Galley:

  was a 32-gun fifth rate launched in 1687.  She underwent a 'great repair' in 1708, and was again rebuilt in 1727 by Peirson Lock at Plymouth Dockyard.  She was broken up in 1743.
  was a 44-gun fourth rate launched in 1744 and sunk as a breakwater in 1764.

See also
 

Royal Navy ship names